Welch, also known as Welsh, is an unincorporated community in Chambers County, Alabama, United States.

History
Welch is likely named for a local family. A post office operated under the name Welsh from 1888 to 1933.

References

Unincorporated communities in Chambers County, Alabama
Unincorporated communities in Alabama